Livio Berruti (born 19 May 1939) is an Italian former athlete who was the winner of the 200-meter dash in the 1960 Summer Olympics.

He won five medals, at individual level, and three medals with the national relay team at the International athletics competitions.

Biography

Berruti was born in Turin where he attended Liceo Classico "Cavour". After high school, while pursuing a degree in chemistry, he competed in the 1960 Rome Olympics. In the semi-finals of the 200 m, spurred by the home crowd, he unexpectedly ran in 20.5 seconds, equalling the then world record for that distance. This made him a surprise outsider for the final, later that day. In that race, Berruti, who was noted for always running with black glasses and white socks, once again clocked 20.5, beating the American favourites to the gold medal.

Anchoring the Italian 4 × 100 m relay team, Berruti narrowly missed out on a second Olympic medal, finishing in 4th. His world record was not beaten until June 1962, but his performance remained a European record for a further two years, until 21 June 1964.

His Olympic victory, at the beginning of his career, would remain his best achievement. His three appearances at the European Championships only brought him a 7th place in the 1966 200 m final. He did, however, win Italian titles in both the 100 and 200 m from 1957 until 1962, and two more 200 m titles in 1965 and 1968. Berruti also made two more Olympic appearances, in 1964 and 1968. On both occasions, he reached the final of the 4 × 100 m relay, and also placed 5th in the 200 m final of 1964.

Olympic results

National titles
Livio Berruti has won 14 times the individual national championship.
6 wins in the 100 metres (1957, 1958, 1959, 1960, 1961, 1962)
8 wins in the 200 metres (1957, 1958, 1959, 1960, 1961, 1962, 1965, 1968)

Awards
On 7 May 2015, in the presence of the President of Italian National Olympic Committee (CONI), Giovanni Malagò, was inaugurated in the Olympic Park of the Foro Italico in Rome, along Viale delle Olimpiadi, the Walk of Fame of Italian sport, consisting of 100 tiles that chronologically report names of the most representative athletes in the history of Italian sport. On each tile are the name of the sportsman, the sport in which he distinguished himself and the symbol of CONI. One of these tiles is dedicated to Livio Berruti.

See also
 Italy national relay team
 Men's 100 metres European record progression
 Men's 200 metres European record progression
 Men's 200 metres world record progression
 FIDAL Hall of Fame
 Legends of Italian sport - Walk of Fame

References

Bibliography

External links
 

1939 births
Living people
Sportspeople from Turin
Italian male sprinters
World record setters in athletics (track and field)
Athletes (track and field) at the 1960 Summer Olympics
Athletes (track and field) at the 1964 Summer Olympics
Athletes (track and field) at the 1968 Summer Olympics
Olympic gold medalists for Italy
Athletics competitors of Fiamme Oro
Medalists at the 1960 Summer Olympics
Olympic gold medalists in athletics (track and field)
Mediterranean Games gold medalists for Italy
Mediterranean Games silver medalists for Italy
Athletes (track and field) at the 1963 Mediterranean Games
Athletes (track and field) at the 1967 Mediterranean Games
Universiade medalists in athletics (track and field)
Mediterranean Games medalists in athletics
Universiade gold medalists for Italy
Universiade bronze medalists for Italy
Olympic athletes of Italy
Italian Athletics Championships winners
Medalists at the 1959 Summer Universiade
Medalists at the 1963 Summer Universiade
Medalists at the 1967 Summer Universiade